Leo William O'Brien (September 21, 1900 – May 4, 1982) was an American journalist, radio and television commentator, and politician. A Democrat, he was most notable for his service as a  member of the United States House of Representatives from New York for 14 years (1952-1966).

Early life
Nicknamed "Obie," O'Brien was born in Buffalo, New York. He graduated from Niagara University in 1922. O'Brien worked as a newspaper journalist for the International News Service, and Albany Knickerbocker Press and Times-Union. He later became a radio and television commentator. From 1935 to 1952 he was a member of the Port of Albany District Commission.

Congressman
In 1952 he was the successful Democratic nominee for the United States House of Representatives seat left vacant by the death of William T. Byrne. He was reelected seven times and served from April 1, 1952 until resigning on December 30, 1966, a few days before the end of his final term. He was not a candidate for reelection in 1966.

As a member of the Committee on Interior and Insular Affairs, O'Brien was a leading advocate for Alaska and Hawaii statehood. He also helped create the Fire Island National Seashore, and strongly advocated cleanup of the Hudson River and protecting it as a scenic waterway.

Later life
After leaving Congress O'Brien served as Chairman of the Albany County Planning Board and the Adirondack Study Commission.

He died at St. Peter's Hospital in Albany, New York on May 4, 1982. He was buried at St. Agnes Cemetery in Menands.

Family
O'Brien married Mabel C. Jean in 1925. They were the parents of a son, Robert.

Legacy

Federal building
The United States federal building in Albany, New York is named after for O'Brien. It is located at the corner of Clinton Avenue and North Pearl Street, and contains facilities including a Military Entrance Processing Station (MEPS).

Honorary degrees
In 1959, O'Brien received the honorary degree of LL.D. from the University of Alaska Fairbanks in recognition of his efforts to promote Alaska statehood. In 1960, O'Brien received an honorary Doctor of Letters degree from Niagara University.

In 1961, he received an honorary LL.D. from Siena College. In May 1966, O'Brien received an honorary Doctor of Humane Letters degree from the Albany College of Pharmacy.

Other
As additional recognition of his Alaska statehood efforts, in 1964 the state government named Mount Terrance, a mountain near Haines, Alaska after O'Brien's 10-year-old grandson.

References

Further reading

Leo W. O'Brien at The Political Graveyard
 Associated Press, Toledo Blade, Death notice, Leo O'Brien, May 5, 1982

1900 births
1982 deaths
Burials at St. Agnes Cemetery
Niagara University alumni
Politicians from Buffalo, New York
Journalists from Upstate New York
Democratic Party members of the United States House of Representatives from New York (state)
20th-century American non-fiction writers
20th-century American politicians
Catholics from New York (state)